{{Infobox martial artist
| name            = Cody Donovan
| other_names     = Donnybrook
| image           = 
| image_size      = 200px
| alt             =
| caption         =
| birth_name      =
| birth_date      = 
| birth_place     = Waterloo, Iowa, United States
| death_date      = 
| death_place     =
| death_cause     =
| residence       = Denver, Colorado
| nationality     = American
| height          = 
| weight_lb       = 205
| weight_class    = Light Heavyweight
| reach           = 
| style           = 
| stance          = 
| fighting_out_of = Denver, Colorado, United States
| team            = Grudge Training Center High Altitude Martial Arts   Jackson's Submission Fighting  
| rank            = Black belt in Brazilian Jiu-Jitsu under Nate Marquardt| years_active    = 2008–2014
| mma_kowin       = 4
| mma_subwin      = 3
| mma_decwin      = 1
| mma_koloss      = 5
| mma_subloss     = 
| mma_decloss     = 
| mma_draw        = 
| mma_nc          = 
| url             = Official Website Official UFC Fighter Profile High Altitude Martial Arts
| sherdog         = 22304
| footnotes       =
| updated         =
}}

Cody Scott Donovan (born February 20, 1981) is an American practitioner of Brazilian Jiu-Jitsu. He is also a retired mixed martial artist, who is perhaps best known for his four-fight stint in the Light Heavyweight division of the Ultimate Fighting Championship. A professional MMA competitor since 2008, Donovan has also competed for Bellator.

Background
Donovan was born in Waterloo, Iowa and is of Irish descent. He began training in Brazilian jiu-jitsu at the age of 17 and also worked as a security guard of a psychiatric ward of a hospital in Denver, Colorado before meeting Nate Marquardt, who introduced Donovan to mixed martial arts. Donovan attended the Art Institute of Colorado and graduated with a degree in media arts.

Mixed martial arts career
Early career
Donovan held an amateur record of 4-1 and compiled a 7-2 record before signing a four-fight deal with the UFC.

Ultimate Fighting Championship
Donovan made his UFC debut on December 15, 2012 at UFC on FX 6 against Canadian Nick Penner, replacing an injured Eddie Mendez on nine days notice. He won the fight via TKO in the first round, earning Fight of the Night'' honors in the process.

Donovan faced Ovince St. Preux on August 17, 2013 at UFC Fight Night 26. He lost the fight via first-round KO.

Donovan was expected to face promotional newcomer Robert Drysdale on November 16, 2013 at UFC 167. However, Drysdale was refused a fighting license by the Nevada State Athletic Commission (NSAC) and was replaced by Gian Villante. He lost the fight via TKO in the second round.

Donovan faced Nikita Krylov on July 19, 2014 at UFC Fight Night 46. He lost the fight via TKO in the first round.

After three consecutive KO/TKO stoppage losses, Donovan announced his retirement from MMA competition.

Personal life
Donovan is married.

Brazilian Jiu-Jitsu Titles

High Altitude Martial Arts
HAMA Light Heavyweight Championship (one time)

Mixed martial arts record

|-
|Loss
|align=center|8–5
|Nikita Krylov
|TKO (punches)
|UFC Fight Night: McGregor vs. Brandao
|
|align=center|1
|align=center|4:57
|Dublin, Ireland
|
|-
|Loss
|align=center|8–4
|Gian Villante
|TKO (punches)
|UFC 167
|
|align=center| 2
|align=center| 1:22
|Las Vegas, Nevada, United States
|
|-
|Loss
|align=center|8–3
|Ovince Saint Preux
|KO (punches)
|UFC Fight Night: Shogun vs. Sonnen
|
|align=center|1
|align=center|2:07
|Boston, Massachusetts, United States
|
|-
|Win
|align=center|8–2
|Nick Penner
|KO (punches)
|UFC on FX: Sotiropoulos vs. Pearson
|
|align=center|1
|align=center|4:35
|Gold Coast, Australia
|
|-
|Win
|align=center|7–2
|Peter Nolan
|Submission (rear-naked choke)
|Instinct Fighting 4
|
|align=center|1
|align=center|3:41
|Montreal, Quebec, Canada
|
|-
|Win
|align=center|6–2
|Brian Albin
|Decision (unanimous)
|Bellator 38
|
|align=center|3
|align=center|5:00
|Tunica, Mississippi, United States
|
|-
|Win
|align=center|5–2
|Xavier Saccomanno
|Submission (rear-naked choke)
|Full Force Fighting 1
|
|align=center|2
|align=center|3:12
|Denver, Colorado, United States
|
|-
|Loss
|align=center|4–2
|Cortez Coleman
|TKO (corner stoppage)
|C3 Fights: Slammin Jammin Weekend 5
|
|align=center|1
|align=center|N/A
|Newkirk, Oklahoma, United States
|
|-
|Win
|align=center|4–1
|Isaac Villanueva
|Submission (rear-naked choke)
|Ascend Combat: The Beginning
|
|align=center|2
|align=center|4:52
|Shreveport, Louisiana, United States
|
|-
|Loss
|align=center|3–1
|Eric Smith
|TKO (punches)
|ROF 36: Demolition
|
|align=center|1
|align=center|3:18
|Denver, Colorado, United States
|
|-
|Win
|align=center|3–0
|Joe Stripling
|TKO (punches)
|Shogun Fights 1
|
|align=center|2
|align=center|1:16
|Baltimore, Maryland, United States
|
|-
|Win
|align=center|2–0
|John Doyle
|TKO (punches and elbows)
|UWC 5: Man O' War
|
|align=center|1
|align=center|2:33
|Fairfax, Virginia, United States
|
|-
|Win
|align=center|1–0
|Wade Drake
|TKO (punches)
|UWC 4: Confrontation
|
|align=center|1
|align=center|0:15
|Fairfax, Virginia, United States
|

References

External links
 
 

1981 births
Living people
American male mixed martial artists
American practitioners of Brazilian jiu-jitsu
People awarded a black belt in Brazilian jiu-jitsu
Ultimate Fighting Championship male fighters
Light heavyweight mixed martial artists
Mixed martial artists utilizing Brazilian jiu-jitsu